Legambo (Amharic: ለጋምቦ) is a woreda in Amhara Region, Ethiopia. This woreda is named for one of the "Houses" or subgroups of the Wollo Amhara, who were located there. Part of the Debub Wollo Zone, Legambo is bordered on the south by Legahida and Kelala, on the southwest by Wegde, on the west by Debre Sina, on the northwest by Sayint, on the north by Tenta, on the northeast by Dessie Zuria, and on the southeast by Were Ilu. Towns in Legambo include Aqesta and Embacheber.

Elevations in this woreda range from 1500 to 3700 meters; the highest point in this woreda, as well as the Debub Wollo Zone, is Mount Amba Ferit, which lies on the border with Sayint.

Demographics
Based on the 2007 national census conducted by the Central Statistical Agency of Ethiopia (CSA), this woreda has a total population of 165,026, an increase of 3.93% over the 1994 census, of whom 81,268 are men and 83,758 women; 7,327 or 4.44% are urban inhabitants. With an area of 1,017.35 square kilometers, Legambo has a population density of 162.21, which is greater than the Zone average of 147.58 persons per square kilometer. A total of 39,078 households were counted in this woreda, resulting in an average of 4.22 persons to a household, and 37,384 housing units. The majority of the inhabitants were Muslim, with 93.34% reporting that as their religion, while 6.5% of the population said they practiced Ethiopian Orthodox Christianity.

The 1994 national census reported a total population for this woreda of 158,785 in 38,182 households, of whom 78,087 were men and 80,698 were women; 4,286 or 2.7% of its population were urban dwellers. The largest ethnic group reported in Legambo was the Amhara (99.9%). Amharic was spoken as a first language by 99.92%. The majority of the inhabitants were Muslim, with 92.99% of the population having reported they practiced that belief, while 6.82% of the population said they professed Ethiopian Orthodox Christianity.

Notes

Districts of Amhara Region